Tomasz Robert Garbowski (born 7 January 1979 in Kluczbork) is a Polish politician. He was elected to the Sejm on 25 September 2005, getting 7,517 votes in 21 Opole district as a candidate from the Democratic Left Alliance list.

See also
Members of Polish Sejm 2005-2007

External links
Tomasz Garbowski - parliamentary page - includes declarations of interest, voting record, and transcripts of speeches.

1979 births
Living people
Democratic Left Alliance politicians
Members of the Polish Sejm 2005–2007
People from Kluczbork
Members of the Polish Sejm 2007–2011
Members of the Polish Sejm 2011–2015